The following is a list of known recordings by or involving Alec Empire, excluding his work with Atari Teenage Riot.

Alec Empire

Studio albums

Compilations

Live albums

EPs

Singles

Remix singles

Live videos

DJ mixes

1 Mail order and online store exclusives
2 Tour exclusives

Compilation appearances

Remixes

Production credits

Other credits

Music videos
Civilisation Virus (a short film by Philipp Virus, soundtrack by Empire, 1993)
"We All Die!" (directed by Philipp Virus, 1994)
"Low on Ice" (Philipp Virus, 1995)
The Report (a short film by Philipp Virus, soundtrack by Empire, 1996)
"You Ain't Nothing" (Alec Empire vs. Elvis Presley) (Philipp Virus, 1999)
"Attack" (with Jon Spencer Blues Explosion) (Philipp Virus, Nimra Lethe & Tom Edon, 1999)
"Addicted to You" (John Hillcoat, 2002)
"The Ride" (Jonathan Miles, 2003)
"New World Order" (Fabien Knecht, 2003)
"Kiss of Death" (Fabien Knecht, 2005)
"On Fire" (Philipp Virus, 2007)

Curse of the Golden Vampire (with Techno Animal)
Curse of the Golden Vampire (DHR 1998)

Death Funk
Funk Riot Beat (DHR 1997)

DJ 6666 feat. The Illegals
Death Breathing (DHR 1998)

DJ Mowgly
Cook EP (DHR 1994)

Video
"Cook" (Philipp Virus, 1994)

E.C.P
E.C.P (Riot Beats 1995)
Generate (Riot Beats 1995)
E.C.P. (feat. The Slaughter of Acid) (Riot Beats 1996)

Jaguar
Jaguar EP (Force Inc. 1994)
Berlin Sky EP (Analog 1995)
Two Space Cowboys on a Bad Trip (with Ian Pooley) (Force Inc. 1996)
Two Space Cowboys on a Trip to Texas (with Ian Pooley) (Force Inc. 1996)
The Jaguar EP (Force Inc 1996)

LX Empire
"Unequal Chord" on the compilation Techno Rave (!Hype 1991)

Production
"There's No Love in Tekkno" (single) by Hanin (Force Inc. 1992)

Naomi Campbell
"Spinball Attack" on the compilation Braindead (Generator Records 1994) 
An edited version of the track "Naomi Campbell" from the Shocker compilation

Nero
"Youth Against Racism" on the compilation Destroy Deutschland! (Force Inc. 1993)

Nintendo Teenage Robots
We Punk Einheit! (DHR 1999)

Video
"We Punk Einheit!" (Philipp Virus, 1999)

P.J.P.
"Noise So Sweet" and "Dreadlock Kool" on the compilation Rough and Fast (Riot Beats 1994)

Richard Benson
Debut EP (Force Inc. 1995)
Diamonds and Pills EP (Force Inc. 1995)
Rich in Paradise EP (Force Inc. 1996)

Compilation appearances
"Feel You Deep Inside" on FIM 100 (Force Inc. 1995)
"You Know How to Love Me" on Rauschen 9 (Force Inc. 1995)

Remix
"Chord Memory" (Richard Benson mix) for Ian Pooley, on "Chord Memory" (Force Inc. 1996)

Wipe Out
"Two Steps Beyond the Terror"/"China Girl" (Position Chrome 1996)

References
Detailed Alec Empire discography (up to 2001) at DigitalHardcore.com
Alec Empire at Discogs

Punk rock discographies
Hip hop discographies
Production discographies
Discographies of German artists